The 1907–08 Iowa State Cyclones men's basketball team was the first ever team representing Iowa State University during the 1907-08 NCAA College men's basketball season. The Cyclones were coached by Clyde Williams, who was in his first season coaching the Cyclones' basketball team. They played their home games for the last time at Margaret Hall Gymnasium in Ames, Iowa. They were also known informally as "Ames" and as the "Aggies".

They finished the season 1–1, 1–0 in Missouri Valley play to finish in second place in the North Division. Despite going 1–0 and Nebraska not having a conference record, Nebraska was still declared the divisional winner due a better inter-divisional record.

Roster

Schedule and results 

|-
!colspan=6 style=""|Regular Season

|-

References 

Iowa State Cyclones men's basketball seasons
Iowa State
Iowa State Cyc
Iowa State Cyc